Martin Richards (born Morton Richard Klein; March 11, 1932 – November 26, 2012) was an Academy-Award winning American film producer.

Biography

Richards was born to Sidney "Sid" Klein, a stockbroker, and his wife, Shirley, and was raised just off the Grand Concourse in the Bronx. He had a younger brother named Bruce, and his parents also owned an arcade on the Keansburg Amusement Park in the 1940s. His friends and the friends of his brother always new he was destined for a career linked to Broadway as he sang show tunes to them as kids.

Career
Richards won an Arthur Godfrey talent search, then appeared on The Ed Sullivan Show and at the Copacabana. He later became a casting director, then a Broadway theatre and film producer.

Richards won the Best Picture Academy Award for Chicago, having optioned film rights to Miramax in 1991. As a Broadway producer, he won three Tony Awards for Best Musical and one Tony Award for Best Revival of a Musical, out of 10 nominations.

Personal life

Despite being gay, Richards became the third husband of Johnson & Johnson heiress and producer Mary Lea Johnson Richards; reportedly, the couple "adored each other". Despite the times being different back then Morty's friend's knew who he was and that he was different and they accepted it and loved him just the same. In his youth Morty and his parents spent their summers in Keansburg New Jersey where Mr and Mrs Klein owned a summer business.

Prior to their marriage, Johnson had been married to bisexual child psychiatrist Dr. Victor D'Arc, who she claimed in 1976 had conspired with his homosexual lover to hire a hitman and murder her; a bodyguard was beaten almost to death during a break-in that almost killed Johnson and Richards. Although the Bronx district attorney opened an investigation, no charges were ultimately brought, and the pair divorced in 1978.

Johnson predeceased Richards in 1990, leaving him a $50 million fortune. Johnson's family waged a twelve-year court battle seeking to render Richards ineligible for a share of the Johnson & Johnson fortune. The court ruled in favor of Richards. In memory of his late wife, Richards created the New York Center for Children to care for abused children and their families. Known to throw lavish parties, he was close to Chita Rivera, who hosted a tribute to Richards on April 8, 2013, at the Edison Ballroom to benefit the center.

He was also notable for physically assaulting "Stuttering" John Melendez at an event in 1996 while the latter was working for the Howard Stern Show.

Death
Richards died from liver cancer at his home in Manhattan on November 26, 2012, at age 80. The marquees of Broadway theatres were dimmed in his memory the night of November 27, 2012 at 7 p.m.

Filmography
Chicago (producer) 2002 
Fort Apache, The Bronx (producer) 1981
The Shining (associate producer: The Producer Circle Organization) 1980 
The Boys from Brazil (producer) 1978
The Image (producer – as Marty Richards) 1975
Fun and Games (producer – as Marty Richards) 1973
Some of My Best Friends Are... (producer – as Marty Richards) 1971

References

External links
 
 

1932 births
2012 deaths
Deaths from cancer in New York (state)
Deaths from liver cancer
Film producers from New York (state)
American gay men
Golden Globe Award-winning producers
LGBT people from New York (state)
LGBT film producers
People from the Bronx
Producers who won the Best Picture Academy Award
Tony Award winners